This is a list of seasons completed by the Jacksonville Sharks. The Sharks are a professional indoor American football franchise in the National Arena League (NAL), based in Jacksonville, Florida, and plays its home games at VyStar Veterans Memorial Arena. The team was established in 2010 in the Arena Football League (AFL) until it left the league after the 2016 season. Until , the Sharks won their division in every year. The team reached ArenaBowl XXV in their second year of play, in which they won the league's championship on a game-winning touchdown as time expired. The team won the NAL Championship in its first season.

References
General
 

Arena Football League seasons by team
 
National Arena League seasons
Jacksonville, Florida-related lists
Florida sports-related lists